Papers is a reference management software for Mac OS X and Windows, used to manage bibliographies and references when writing essays and articles. It is primarily used to organize references and maintain a library of PDF documents and also provides a uniform interface for document repository searches, metadata editing, full screen reading and a variety of ways to import and export documents.

Overview
Papers was developed by Alexander Griekspoor and Tom Groothuis while studying towards their Ph.D.s at the Netherlands Cancer Institute. The pair worked on Papers to provide an iTunes-like approach to document management, after they were faced with working with hundreds of digital publications in PDF format. Papers was originally released as a public preview in February 2007, followed by the full 1.0 version a few months later. A new version of the software was released and put for sale in the third quarter of 2013, along with a new iPhone/iPad app. Both products went under a considerable amount of criticism from new and returning users, who experienced a number of issues, ranging from lost databases and annotations to incompatibility between mobile and desktop apps. Users criticised Mekentosj and Springer, respectively developer and owner of Papers, for putting up for sale a beta version of the software and their slowness in addressing problems that effectively rendered the software unusable.

On March 16, 2016, ReadCube acquired Papers from Springer Nature for an undisclosed amount. ReadCube Papers has been available since Fall 2019.

Versions

Mac
With the release of Papers 2 in March 2011, Papers provides EndNote-style reference citation features. Papers 2 also allows for users to access their library and insert citations across a variety of different applications, whether in documents, presentations, or in web browsers. Papers offers a familiar user interface and a number of features for collecting, curating, merging and linking articles.

A new version for Mac was released in late 2013: Papers 3. This version introduces a redesigned user interface and Dropbox-based syncing, which has subsequently been expanded to other cloud-based repositories. 

As of November 1 2018, Papers 3 is no longer available for sale and will no longer be actively developed. The new version of Papers is developed by ReadCube.

Windows

Papers 3 for Windows was first released in 2012. A new version, now Papers 3 for Windows, was released late July 2014 following the redesign of the Mac and iOS applications earlier. This version was intended to streamline the user experience and the features available from the Mac application. Papers 3 for Windows also added unified search to its platform. It supported Dropbox syncing between Mac and iOS devices running Papers 3 as well as Papers Online. The Windows version of Papers 3 has been withdrawn from sale and is no longer available.

Browser
The online version of Papers runs in most modern Web browsers. Users can access their library by signing in through their institutional or personal email address. Libraries will automatically sync and have unlimited cloud storage.

iPhone and iPad
Versions of Papers are available for free from the Apple App Store for iPhone and iPad. A version was released with the Papers 3 for Mac launch and features unified search on the iOS app as well. The newest version of Papers is available via the Mac App Store. It has the article management features, and in addition to the standard annotation features the new Papers for iOS also features freehand annotations and supports Apple Pencil. Papers for iOS can be synchronized via a cloud storage system provided by ReadCube.

Android
A version of Papers is available for Android users and can be downloaded for free via Google Play. It automatically syncs to the Papers desktop and web applications.

Papers Online (legacy)
Papers Online was a set of services released in conjunction with Papers 3 for Windows. It worked across a variety of platforms and offers users a means of sharing collections of articles. Papers 3 users can create shared collections and access them from a browser on most devices and share collections to be accessed by other Papers 3 users as well as individuals who are not currently using Papers 3. This version is no longer available.

Awards
Papers won an Apple Design Award#2007 in 2007, for the best Mac OS X Scientific Computing Solution.

See also
 Comparison of reference management software for some comparisons with similar packages.
 ReadCube

References

External links
 

MacOS-only software
Reference management software